Hein-Peter Weyher (born 22 March 1935) is a retired German Vizeadmiral and former Inspector of the Navy from 1991 until 1995.

References

External links
`

1935 births
Vice admirals of the German Navy
Living people
Chiefs of Navy (Germany)